The cinnamon teal (Spatula cyanoptera) is a species of duck found in western North and South America. It is a small dabbling duck, with bright reddish plumage on the male and duller brown plumage on the female. It lives in marshes and ponds, and feeds mostly on plants.

Description 

The adult male has a cinnamon-red head and body with a brown back, a red eye and a dark bill. The adult female has a mottled brown body, a pale brown head, brown eyes and a grey bill and is very similar in appearance to a female blue-winged teal; however, its overall color is richer, the lores, eye line, and eye ring are less distinct. Its bill is longer and more spatulate. Male juvenile resembles a female cinnamon or blue-winged teal but their eyes are red. They have 2 adult molts per year and a third molt in their first year.

Distribution 
Their breeding habitat is marshes and ponds in western United States and extreme southwestern Canada, and are rare visitors to the east coast of the United States. Cinnamon teal generally select new mates each year. They are migratory and most winter in northern South America and the Caribbean, generally not migrating as far as the blue-winged teal. Some winter in California and southwestern Arizona. Two subspecies of cinnamon teal reside within the Andes of South America. The smaller sized S. c. cyanoptera is widespread within low elevations (<1000m) such as the coast of Peru and southern Argentina, whereas the larger size subspecies S. c. orinomus occupies elevations of 3500–4600 meters in the central Andes.

Behavior 

These birds feed by dabbling. They mainly eat plants; their diet may include molluscs and aquatic insects.

Taxonomy 
They are known to interbreed with blue-winged teals, which are very close relatives.

Subspecies are:
 Spatula cyanoptera septentrionalium (Oberholser, 1906) northern cinnamon teal breeds from British Columbia to northwestern New Mexico, and they winter in northwestern South America.
 Spatula cyanoptera tropica (Snyder & Lumsden, 1951) tropical cinnamon teal occurs in the Cauca Valley and Magdalena Valley in Colombia.
 Spatula cyanoptera borreroi (Snyder & Lumsden, 1951) Borrero's cinnamon teal (possibly extinct) occurs in the eastern Andes of Colombia with records of apparently resident birds from northern Ecuador. It is named for Colombian ornithologist José Ignacio Borrero.
 Spatula cyanoptera orinoma (Snyder & Lumsden, 1951) Andean cinnamon teal occurs in the Altiplano of Peru, northern Chile and Bolivia.
 Spatula cyanoptera cyanoptera (Vieillot, 1816) Argentine cinnamon teal occurs in southern Peru, southern Brazil, Argentina, Chile, and the Falkland Islands.

References

Works cited
Clements, James, (2007) The Clements Checklist of the Birds of the World, Cornell University Press, Ithaca
Dunn, J. & Alderfer, J. (2006) National Geographic Field Guide to the Birds of North America 5th Ed.
Floyd, T (2008) Smithsonian Field Guide to the Birds of North America HarperCollins, NY
Herrera, Néstor; Rivera, Roberto; Ibarra Portillo, Ricardo & Rodríguez, Wilfredo (2006): Nuevos registros para la avifauna de El Salvador. ["New records for the avifauna of El Salvador"]. Boletín de la Sociedad Antioqueña de Ornitología 16(2): 1–19. [Spanish with English abstract]PDF fulltext

External links

 
Cinnamon Teal, Birds of North America Online
 Cinnamon Teal Species Account – Cornell Lab of Ornithology
 
 

cinnamon teal
Birds of the Americas
Native birds of Western Canada
Native birds of the Canadian Prairies
Native birds of the Western United States
Birds of Argentina
Birds of Colombia
Birds of Ecuador
Birds of the Falkland Islands
Birds of Mexico
Birds of Patagonia
Birds of Peru
Birds of Uruguay
cinnamon teal
cinnamon teal